Mappin was a traditional department store in Brazil, based in São Paulo, with the official name of Casa Anglo-Brasileira S/A. With origins in 1774 in the city of Sheffield, England, it was later brought to Brazil by the brothers Walter and Hebert Mappin.

History
During the 86 years in which it served São Paulo, it was one of the pioneers of the retail trade. In the 1930s, innovated by putting labels with prices in the windows. Was the driving force behind the installment plan. Between 1940s and 1950s, Mappin was the meeting point of São Paulo elite. Anticipated the "concept" of shopping mall, bringing together products of various types in one location. The store at Praça Ramos de Azevedo, in the center of São Paulo, has become a benchmark of the brand.

Some branches were opened:

1969 – Rua São Bento
1977 – Avenida São João: the first of São Paulo to have its own parking lot
1984 – Itaim Bibi
1987 – Shopping Mappin ABC, the first store outside the São Paulo state capital
1991 – Shopping Center Norte, Shopping West Plaza and Shopping Morumbi
1991 – It was created the TV Mappin: sale of products by telephone
1993 – Shopping Jardim Sul
1995 – Esplanada Shopping, in Sorocaba, São Paulo state countryside

Its most famous jingle was: "Mappin, venha correndo, Mappin, chegou a hora, Mappin, é a liquidação" [Mappin, come running, Mappin, the hour has come, Mappin, it is the sale].

Campaigns
 Liquida, liquida! Eletrodomésticos, higiene, autopeças, etc. [Sale, sale! Home appliances, hygiene, car parts, etc.] (1975)
 Economia é só no Mappin [Economy is only on Mappin] (1977/78)
 Compre tudo para a Copa do Mundo [Buy everything for the World Cup] (1986)
 Compre de novo para a Copa do Mundo [Buy again for the World Cup] (1990)
 TV Mappin (1992)
 Turma da Mônica (1980–1999) (bankruptcy)

The end
It closed down in 1999, during the administration of Ricardo Mansur. It had its bankruptcy decreed along with the Mesbla stores, who had been incorporated into Mappin in 1996. In 1999, Grupo Pão de Açúcar, through the Extra hypermarkets, took over the store in Praça Ramos de Azevedo, whose building belongs to the Santa Casa, with the "Extra Mappin" flag, and soon abandoned it. In 2003, the store was closed under the allegation of having low profitability, not offsetting the point of sale maintenance costs, and the store did not meet more at the "quality standards that should be part of all the flags of the group."

According to the Mônica Bergamo's column on 3 June 2009, Ricardo Mansur, the last owner of the network, considered to reopen Mappin, including forwarding a request of bankruptcy to the judge and tried to raise money from international investors. However, on 12 November 2010 there was a judicial auction, and the Mappin brand, valued at R$12 million, was bought by the network Lojas Marabraz by less than half of the price. The general director of Marabraz, Nasser Fares, aims to put the brand on active duty, at the latest in 2016.

See also
 Mesbla

References

Defunct department stores
Defunct companies of Brazil
Retail companies established in 1913
Retail companies disestablished in 1999
Companies that have filed for bankruptcy in Brazil